J. Walter "Mickey" Sullivan (January 10, 1916 – August 28, 2000) was an American football player and coach. He served as the head football coach at Wagner College in Staten Island, New York from 1957 to 1961, compiling a record of 26–16. Sullivan was drafted by the Pittsburgh Steelers in the 1940 NFL Draft. A native of Staten Island, Sullivan coached high school football before he was hired at Wagner in 1957.

Head coaching record

College

References

1916 births
2000 deaths
American football ends
NC State Wolfpack football players
Wagner Seahawks football coaches
High school football coaches in New York (state)
Sportspeople from Staten Island
Players of American football from New York City